John Aylward (November 7, 1946 – May 16, 2022) was an American actor.

He was best known for playing the former DNC chairman Barry Goodwin on the NBC television series The West Wing and for playing Dr. Donald Anspaugh on the NBC television series ER. He also provided voice for Dr. Arne Magnusson in Half-Life 2: Episode Two.

Life and career
Aylward was born and raised in Seattle, Washington.  He attended St. Joseph's Grade school and went on to Prep High School, but graduated from Garfield High School in 1965.  He graduated from the Professional Actor's Training Program at the University of Washington in 1970. He was one of the founders, in 1973, of Seattle's Empty Space Theatre, and he worked regularly as a company member of the Seattle Repertory Theatre. He appeared in dramas by David Mamet, Arthur Miller and Tennessee Williams. Carol Flynt, co-producer of ER, first offered him an audition after seeing him in a 1996 production of "Psychopathia Sexualis" at the Mark Taper Forum in Los Angeles.

He appeared in numerous television shows. He played Father Edward Devine in the 2020 sports drama movie The Way Back.

Aylward died in Seattle on May 16, 2022, at the age of 75.

Filmography

Film

Television

Video games

References

External links
 
 
 
 Industry Central, John Aylward

1946 births
2022 deaths
American male film actors
American male television actors
American male voice actors
20th-century American male actors
21st-century American male actors
Male actors from Seattle
University of Washington School of Drama alumni